Ramstein or Rammstein may refer to:

Places
 Ramstein-Miesenbach, Rhineland-Palatinate, Germany, a town
 Ramstein Air Base, a US Air Force base near the town
 Château de Ramstein (Bas-Rhin), France, a castle 
 Château de Ramstein (Moselle), France, a castle

Art, entertainment, and media
 Rammstein, a German band
 "Rammstein" (song), by Rammstein, commemorating the Ramstein airshow disaster

Other
 110393 Rammstein, an asteroid named after the German band
 Ramstein (wrestler), the ring name of a Mexican professional wrestler
 Ramstein air show disaster, a 1988 mid-air collision at the Ramstein Air Force Base